Tom Zubrycki (born in London, England, in 1946) is an Australian documentary filmmaker. He is "widely respected as one of Australia's leading documentary filmmakers", according to The Concise Routledge Encyclopedia of the Documentary Film. His films on social, environmental and political issues have won international prizes and have been screened around the world. He is an active member of the Australian Directors Guild and lectures in the Open Program of the Australian Film, Television and Radio School.

Personal life and activities 
Zubrycki was born in the UK. His father was Jerzy Zubrzycki, a university academic credited as one of the main architects of the Australian government’s policy on multiculturalism. The family migrated to Australia in 1955, where he attended St Edmunds College, Canberra ACT Australia; Australian National University, Canberra; and University of New South Wales, Sydney.

Zubrycki completed a Bachelor of Science degree at the Australian National University, Canberra, and the immediately left Canberra for Sydney where he got a job at Abbotsleigh, a private girls college on Sydney’s north shore. There he taught science as well as directing and staging several plays including The Maids, by Jean Genet.  He also became involved in the anti-Vietnam War movement and joined SDS (Students for a Democratic Society). In 1970 he enrolled part-time for a Masters in Sociology at the University of New South Wales, Sydney.  Whilst studying Zubrycki obtained a teaching position at the International School in North Ryde.

While studying Sociology, Zubrycki became inspired by the Canadian Challenge for Change scheme, which used film and video to empower local communities.[6] The videos were shown in town halls, community centers and people's houses in a period before domestic video players were available.   In 1974 the Whitlam Labor government funded 12 video access resource centres across Australia which were modelled on the Canadian scheme. Zubrycki eventually became a leading player in the development of the community video in Australia before switching to direct his first feature documentary. 
Through the 70’s Zubrycki became an active member of the Sydney Filmmakers Co-operative and served on the editorial board of Filmnews. His first two films Waterloo and Kemira – Diary Of A Strike were distributed by the Co-op.  
Over the course of his career, Zubrycki has directed 16 documentaries. most of them feature-length, produced another 20, and executive produced 2.

Apart from making films, Zubrycki is also a teacher of documentary. Between 2003 and 2008 he lectured in documentary at University of Technology, Sydney, and from 2010 taught documentary masterclasses in the Open Program of Australian Film, Television and Radio School.[3] 
Zubrycki has also worked extensively as an assessor of projects for Australian government film bodies, and for a brief period was a commissioning editor for SBS Independent. He is actively involved in the Australian Directors Guild and served for several years on the board. He is also a founding member of OZDOX, the Australian Documentary Forum, and serves on the Film Advisory Panel of the Sydney Film Festival.
In 2018 Zubrycki was commissioned by Currency House to write a Platform Paper about the current state of documentary in Australia.  The Paper titled “The Changing Landscape of Australian Documentary” was published a year later. It canvassed the history of documentary in Australia and made critical observations about how the sector is struggling after cuts in government funding, despite recent cinema hits. The Paper called for government regulation of streaming platforms like Netflix, Amazon and Stan to compel them to invest in more Australian documentaries.

Tom Zubrycki is married to Julia Overton; Julia Overton executive produces documentaries for broadcast and theatrical release. She travels regularly to international festival and markets and teaches and mentors developing filmmakers. They have one child Sam Zubrycki, who is also a filmmaker.

Writing/directing career 
After finishing a degree in sociology, Between 1974 and 1978 Zubrycki filmed, directed and edited short social impact videos using black and white porta-paks in collaboration with Sydney-based community groups and trade unions.[5] These were his first visual documentary projects and included We Have To Live With It (1974) and Fig Street Fiasco (1974).  We Have To Live With It  was triggered by an incident in Balmain, Sydney where a container truck from the terminal in Mort Bay lost its breaks and crushed a small car killing the passengers on board. The outcry led to the formation of a local resident action group. Zubrycki was a member of the group, and quickly shot and edited a video which was screened it at a large town hall meeting.  The screening fired-up debate over the issue.  A delegation of residents met with the minister responsible, and showed him the video.  The container terminal closed within a year and the trucks disappeared!  This was one of the first times in Australia where video was used as a social action tool with an objective of achieving change.

In 1976 Zubrycki obtained a job in a community centre in Marrickville to make similar social impact videos.  He was also supplied with a budget to build and operate a mobile facility.  The Community Media Bus, as it came to be known, was re-fitted out as a mobile office and production studio.  It operated around the suburb of Marrickville, Newtown and Dulwich Hill.

The limits of the new video technology and his desire to reach wider audiences ultimately forced Zubrycki to switch to 16mm film and to feature-length documentaries. Using the networks developed while making these early videos, Zubrycki completed Waterloo in 1981. The film, which focused attention on the negative social impacts of Sydney's rapid urban development, won the prize for Best Documentary at the 1981 Sydney Film Festival.

Zubrycki's films have a style that he has developed over the course of his career. The subjects of his documentaries are, on the most part, drawn from issues of the day, and personalised.  He usually works in a documentary or "observational style" and his films are narrative-based and character-driven. His first documentaries were stories that focused on the victims of Australia's rapid economic and social re-structuring. They included Waterloo (1981) about the effects of urban redevelopment on a Sydney suburb; Kemira - Diary of a Strike (1984) about an underground colliery sit-in strike near Wollongong which won an AFI Award for Best Documentary, and Friends & Enemies (1985) about a protracted and bitter union dispute in Queensland that saw the rise of the New Right in Australian politics.

In 1988, he was contracted by Film Australia to write and direct a documentary commissioned by the Australian Council of Trade Unions (ACTU) and funded by The Australian Bicentennial Authority. However, owing to an editorial difference between the filmmaker and the ACTU, the film was never officially completed. Zubrycki claimed that he was forced to re-write history in accordance with the wishes of key ACTU officials who wanted to de-emphasize direct industrial action as a way of improving wages and conditions. The unfinished film was screened at the Melbourne International Film Festival in 1989, and copies on VHS tape circulated in Australia.

In the late 1980s, Zubrycki made two documentaries in Broome, Western Australia: Lord of the Bush (1990), a bio-pic about eccentric British developer Lord Alistair McAlpine and his plans to create a new ‘civilization’ in Australia's north; and Bran Nue Dae (1991), about the first Aboriginal musical written and performed in Australia. The documentary featured the indigenous playwright Jimmy Chi.

In the early 1990s, Zubrycki's focus turned to migrant and refugee families, and the stresses caused by cultural conflict, and the search for identity and home. In 1993, he completed Homelands about an El Salvadorean refugee family and the anatomy of a marriage under stress. This was followed by Billal (1995), a documentary that followed the dramatic aftermath of a racially motivated incident involving a Lebanese teenage boy and his family.

Zubrycki was employed as a commissioning editor at SBS-TV in 1996/97, but quickly returned to directing, making The Diplomat (2000), about the former exiled East Timorese leader Jose Ramos-Horta and the final two years of his 25-year campaign to secure his homeland's independence. The film won the 2000 AACTA Award for Best Documentary and Best Director. The Concise Routledge Encyclopedia of the Documentary Film called it his most successful film.

This was soon followed by The Secret Safari (2001), a historical documentary set in the Apartheid era about a covert operation involving a specially designed Bedford truck which used the cover of a safari tour to run weapons and munitions to Umkhonto we Sizwe operatives in the townships of Cape Town and Johannesburg. This film involved re-enactment as part of the story-telling structure and was a stylistic departure.

In 2003, he returned to Australia and made Molly & Mobarak, a story about a Hazara refugee from Afghanistan who finds work in an Australian country town and falls in love with a local schoolteacher. The film secured cinema release around Australia, opened the Margaret Mead Film Festival in New York in 2003, and was screened in competition at IDFA.

This was followed in 2005 by Vietnam Symphony, about how during the American War (aka Vietnam War) the Hanoi Conservatorium of Music -  teachers and students - evacuated to a village where it continued to operate for five years. In 2007, he made Temple of Dreams about an Islamic Youth Centre in Lidcombe and its battle with the local municipal council that wants to shut it down. In 2011, he completed The Hungry Tide, a personal story about the impact of climate change on the small Pacific nation of Kiribati, which was premiered at the Sydney Film Festival and screened in competition at IDFA.

In 2017 Zubrycki completed his last film Hope Road, which was 5 years in the making.  A refugee from the Sudanese civil war, Zacharia (one of the ‘lost boys’ of Sudan) lives in Australia, with his partner and daughter.  Like many others who are forced to leave their homeland, Zacharia wants to give something back and improve the lives of people he left behind. Zac’s ambitious dream is to build a much-needed school in his home village, now part of the new nation of South Sudan.  For support he enlists the backing of an unlikely band of Aussie supporters who join him on a 40-day charity walk to raise funds for this venture.  But life disrupts the best-laid plans, and Zac has to draw on all his resources to keep his dream alive. Hope Road, had its world premiere at the Sydney Film Festival on June 14, 2017, and also screen at the Melbourne International Film Festival

Producing career 
In the early 1990s, Zubrycki started producing the work of emerging directors. One of the first films he produced was Exile in Sarajevo (1996), a personal story about the last of the Siege of Sarajevo during the Balkan war. The film won an International Emmy in 1998.

In the following two decades Zubrycki worked as a mentor to many Indigenous directors, producing a mix of TV documentaries and features. These includes films like Stolen Generations (2000), an historical account of the policy and practise of removal of 'part-descent' Aboriginal children from their parents.  Gulpilil - One Red Blood (2002) about the celebrated Indigenous actor. Both were written and directed by Darlene Johnson. Other films included Wanja (2009), a short documentary by Angie Abdilla about 'the Block' - an indigenous community in the heart of Sydney - told through the eyes of Auntie Barb and the life of Wanja her blue heeler dog,  Mad Morro (2009) following the life of a Indigenous man recently from jail (by Kelrick Martin ), Intervention - Katherine NT, A record of the first year of The Northern Territory Emergency Intervention and its impact on the town of Katherine and the surrounding communities, directed by Julie Nimmo, and [https://www.roninfilms.com.au/video/0/0/17483.html?words=Weather+Diaries&searchby=details The Weather Diaries, a mother's meditation on the future for her musician daughter in the shadow of the twin threats of climate change and mass extinction.
Other notable features Zubrycki produced include The Sunnyboy (2013) directed by Kaye Harrison about Jeremy Oxley the enigmatic lead singer of the 1980s band Sunnyboys and his gradual recovery from schizophrenia leading to the band's successful come-back, and Ablaze a film about Bill Onus – a truly heroic cultural and political figure who revived his people’s culture in the 1940’s and 50’s and helped ignite a civil rights movement that helped change the course of history for Indigenous Australians.

Films 

2022  Senses Of Cinema (88 mins, Co-Producer, Co-Director)]
2022  My Rembetika Blues (83 mins, Producer)]
2021  Ablaze (81 mins, Producer)
2020  The Weather Diaries (88 mins, Producer) 
2018  Teach A Man To Fish (86 min, Producer)
2017  Hope Road (103 mins, Director/Producer)
2017  The Panther Within (52 mins, Producer)
2013  The Sunnyboy (2013, Producer), official website</ref>
2012: Light from the Shadows (26 mins, Producer)
2011 The Hungry Tide (83 mins, Director/Producer)
2009  Intervention - Katherine NT  (56 mins, Producer)
2008  Mad Morro (46 mins, Producer)
2007  Temple of Dreams ( 89 mins. Director/Producer)
2006  The Prodigal Son (28 mins, Producer)]
2005  Vietnam Symphony (52 mins, Director/Producer)
2003  Molly & Mobarak (85 mins, Director/Producer)\
2002  Gulpilil - One Red Blood (56 mins, Producer)
2002  Making Venus (82 mins,Producer)
2001  The Secret Safari (52 mins, Director)
2000  Stolen Generations (56 mins, Producer)
2000  The Diplomat (84 mins, Director)'
1998  Whiteys Like Us (52 mins, Producer)
1996 Exile in Sarajevo (90 mins, Producer).
1995  Billal (87 mins, Director/Producer)
1993  Homelands (79 mins, Director/Producer)
1991  Bran Nue Dae (55 mins, Director/Producer)
1990  Lord of the Bush (55 mins, Director/Producer)
1990  Amongst Equals (90 mins, Director/Producer) 
1985  Friends & Enemies (90 mins, Director/Producer)
1984: Kemira - Diary of a Strike (62 mins, Director/Producer)
1981: Waterloo (48 mins, Director/Producer)

Awards and honours 
In 2010, the Australian International Documentary Conference presented Tom with the highest award for a documentary practitioner, the Stanley Hawes Award "in recognition of outstanding contribution to documentary filmmaking in Australia". In his presentation he criticized the mainstream broadcasters ABC and SBS for commissioning factual programs that were format-driven and light in content. He called for a dramatic increase in Screen Australia's Signature Fund in order to finance documentaries that were not dependent on broadcaster commissions.

1981: Sydney Film Festival, Greater Union Awards, Best Documentary, Sydney Film Festival, Waterloo 
1984: AFI Awards, Best Documentary, Kemira - Diary of a Strike 
1992: Film Critics Circle of Australia, Best Documentary, Homelands
1998: International Emmy, Best Documentary, Exile in Sarajevo
2000: AFI Award, Best Documentary, The Diplomat 
2000: AFI Award, Best Direction, The Diplomat 
2000: Hawaii International Film Festival, First Prize, The Diplomat
2001: Sydney Film Festival, Dendy Awards, Best Documentary, The Secret Safari
2005: AFI Award, Best Sound in a non-feature film, Vietnam Symphony 
2009: Cecil Holmes Award (Australian Directors Guild)
2010: Stanley Hawes Award presented by The Australian International Documentary Conference (AIDC).
2021: Victorian Premier's History Award, with Alec Morgan and Tirki Onus, for Ablaze – A Feature Documentary

References

Selected readings 

Zubrycki’s point: Amongst Equals, utilitarian film in the Australian labour movement y John Hughes (2019) in Studies in Documentary Film, 13:2, 103-126 

Visceral response" – an interview with Tom Zubrycki by Paul Byrnes. Sydney Film Festival 1954 to Now.

Time, Memory and History in the Labor Documentary film: An examination of Friends & Enemies  in Studies in Documentary Film 13(2):1-10 · April 2019 

The Hungry Tide  - a review  by Shweta Kishore in Metro Magazine Issue 171, 2012. 

A Nation Slips Under The Waves: Tom Zubrycki’s The Hungry Tide in Real Time Arts Issue 105, Oct 2011  

The journey we take together – an interview with Tom Zubrycki in Metro Magazine 171 March 2011.

Lebanese Muslims Speak Back: Two films by Tom Zubrycki by Susi Khamis in Diasporas in Australian Cinema, Intellect Books 2009

Exploring Power and Trust In Documentary - A Study of Tom Zubrycki’s Molly and Mobarak. In Studies in Documentary Film Volume 4, No 1, 2010

Beyond the Frame - Documentary from a participant's perspective. Part 1: Stealing Moments, Tom Zubrycki’s Molly and Mobarak in Metro Magazine

I’m Falling in Your Love. Cross-Cultural Romance and the Refugee film by Sonia Magdalena Tascon in Diasporas in Australian Cinema, Intellect Books, 2009.

Tom Zubrycki: On filmmaking, history and other obsessions by Patrick Armstrong  in Metro Magazine 2005

Reclaiming The Personal As Political in Metro Magazine, No 138 by Mary Debrett. 2002 

Documentary – a personal view in  SECOND TAKE – Australian    Filmmakers Talk by Burton & Caputo, Allen & Unwin 1999.

Showing some fight: Kemira's challenge to industrial relations" by Rebecca Coyle & Lisa Milner pp 178 - 183 Metro Magazine 153, 2007
"Tom Zubrycki shares the stories behind some of his most acclaimed documentaries"  Australian Screen Online

Australian documentaries will founder without courage and funds. Opinion piece in The Sydney Morning Herald. February 24, 2010

Ahead of history - the documentary filmmaker in the age of extremes. The 2000 NSW Premier’s History Awards Address

Documentary: A personal view". Article in Second Take ed. by Raffaele Caputo & Geoff Burton. Allen & Unwin (publishers), 1999

Politicising the Community and the Personal – the construction of narrative in the cinema of Tom Zubrycki, by Kerry L Peachey. MA Thesis. Griffith University 1995.

Going Public with private turmoil  in Sydney Morning Herald, October 7, 1993.

Postcards to Beirut – a documentary screenplay (co-writer Stan Correy) in HOMELAND ed. George Pappaelinas. Allen & Unwin (publishers), 1991

Interview with Tom Zubrycki and Russ Hermann in "Scanlines - video art in Australia since the 1960s"

External links 
 

1946 births
Living people
Australian documentary filmmakers